Newport County may refer to:

 Newport County, Rhode Island, United States
 Newport County A.F.C., an association football club based in the city of Newport, South Wales, United Kingdom